Funny Valentines is a 1999 American drama television film directed by Julie Dash and starring Alfre Woodard.  It is based on J. California Cooper's short story of the same name.

Synopsis
A troubled marriage and addressing a former friendship with her mildly mentally disabled cousin await a woman returning to her home town.

Cast
Alfre Woodard as Joyce May
Loretta Devine as Dearie B.
CCH Pounder as Ethel B.
Peter Jay Fernandez as Danny
Megalyn Echikunwoke as Lauren
Kajuana Shuford as Gail
Kiara Tucker as Young Joyce
Saycon Sengbloh as Young Dearie B.
Christopher Dunn as Robert Earl
Tom Wright as Dr. Thomas Holder
Von Coulter as Troy Watts

Production
Filming occurred in Wilmington, North Carolina.

References

External links
 

American drama films
Films scored by Stanley Clarke
Films based on short fiction
Films shot in North Carolina
1999 drama films
1999 films
Films directed by Julie Dash
1990s English-language films
1990s American films